National High School Games is the largest multi-sport event for junior and senior high school players in Taiwan. The Games started in 1952, under the name of Taiwan Provincial High School Games. It is now organized by the Sports Administration of the Ministry of Education. The host city changes every year. The name "National High School Games" has been used since 2000.

Sports
The following sports are National High School Games official programs:
Archery
Association football
Athletics (sport)
Badminton
Gymnastics
Judo
Karate
Martial arts
Powerlifting
Soft tennis
Swimming (sport)
Table tennis
Taekwondo
Team handball
Tennis
Wrestling

Results

Football (soccer)
The football (soccer) program at the National High School Games is probably the most important event for high school football teams in Taiwan. In each group, 8 teams are selected to compete in the final round after playing in the qualifying tournaments.

U-19 men

U-16 men

U-19 women

U-16 women

Hosts
 2007: Tainan County
 2006: Hsinchu City
 2005: Chiayi County
 2004: Hualien County
 2003: Tainan City

Multi-sport events in Taiwan
Football competitions in Taiwan